Gynandromorphus is a ground beetle genus native to the Palearctic (including Europe) and the Near East. It contains the single species Gynandromorphus etruscus.

References

External links

Gynandromorphus at Fauna Europaea

Harpalinae